Solea is a genus of soles from the Indo-Pacific and East Atlantic Oceans, and the Mediterranean Sea.

Species
The currently recognized species in this genus are:
 Solea aegyptiaca Chabanaud, 1927 (Egyptian sole)
 Solea capensis Gilchrist, 1902
 Solea elongata F. Day, 1877 (elongated sole)
 Solea heinii Steindachner, 1903
 Solea ovata J. Richardson, 1846 (ovate sole)
 Solea senegalensis Kaup, 1858 (Senegalese sole)
 Solea solea (Linnaeus, 1758) (common sole)
 Solea stanalandi J. E. Randall & McCarthy, 1989 (Stanaland's sole)
 Solea turbynei Gilchrist, 1904

References

Soleidae
Marine fish genera
Taxa named by Conrad Quensel